The Accolade may refer to:
 The Accolade (Leighton), a 1901 pre-Raphaelite painting by Edmund Leighton
 The AccoLade (band), an all-girl rock band from Jeddah
 "The Accolade", a 1997 song by Symphony X from The Divine Wings of Tragedy
 The Accolade, a student newspaper of Centennial High School in Roswell, Georgia

See also
 Accolade (disambiguation)